The Albanian Supercup 2013 was the 20th edition of the Albanian Supercup since its establishment in 1989. The match was contested between the 2012–13 Albanian Cup winners KF Laçi and the 2012–13 Albanian Superliga champions Skënderbeu Korçë. The cup was won by Skënderbeu Korçë after penalties (4–3), since regular and extra time ended in a 1–1 draw. This was the first Supercup trophy for Skënderbeu Korçë, having lost two previous finals against KF Tirana.

Details

See also
 2012–13 Albanian Superliga
 2012–13 Albanian Cup

References

2011
Supercup
Albanian Supercup, 2013
Albanian Supercup, 2013